Club Deportivo La Asunción  is a Salvadoran professional football club based in Anamorós, El Salvador.

The club currently plays in the Segunda División de Fútbol Salvadoreño.

Honours
Primera División: 0
Segunda Division: 2
Champions: (2) : TBD

Tercera Division: 1
Champions: (1) : TBD

List of Coaches

El Salvador:
 Carlos Mario Joya
 Matir Paredes (2010–2014)
 Edwin Garay (2014)
  Carlos Romero (2009)
 Ángel Orellana (July 2015 – Sep 2015)
 Juan Ramón Trejo (Sep 2015 – Jan 2016)
 Juan Francisco Najarro

Brazil :
  Eraldo Correia (Jan 2016–)

La Asuncion
La Asuncion
1977 establishments in El Salvador